Karintha Styles (September 9, 1979) is an American sports journalist and author.

Education 
Styles was born September 9, 1979 in Detroit, Michigan. She has a degree in journalism from Howard University in Washington, D.C. and a Masters in Public Relations from Full Sail University in Winter Park, FL.

Career
Styles began her career at Howard University, as the second female sports editor of the student-run newspaper, The Hilltop, in 1968. After graduating, she worked with the Washington Wizards briefly before going into the Army. While in the military, Styles worked as a broadcast journalist, appearing regularly on the Armed Forces Network.  

After leaving the service, Styles returned to sports journalism. While at the daily new The Oklahoman, she covered college basketball. From 2010 to 2014, Styles covered the NFL and NBA respectively for the Times Picayune.

During her career, Styles has covered college sports, Major League Baseball, the National Football League and the National Basketball Association, the Super Bowl, three Final Fours, and five NBA Finals. Notably, she covered the Mississippi State win over UConn, that ended UConn's consecutive game winning streak at 111 games of top-ranked Connecticut Huskies women's basketball by the SEC (she was in Dallas to cover the 2017 NCAA Division I women's basketball tournament).

Personal life
Styles currently lives in New Orleans, Louisiana. She wrote a book of poems titled A Stroke of Life.

References

External links
https://karintha.com
https://apple.news/ThulUxc5DRf2dtntZwXGUkQ
https://karintha.com/2018/10/teasha-bivins-beauty-bivfam-brains-boss-moves/
https://www.foxsports.com/nba/story/detroit-pistons-5-dream-free-agency-targets-in-2017-062617
https://sports.yahoo.com/news/spotlight-saints-trey-hendrickson-174417314.html

1979 births
Living people
IHeartMedia
African-American sports journalists
American sports journalists
African-American writers
American sports radio personalities
American sportswriters
American television sports announcers
National Basketball Association broadcasters
National Football League announcers
Howard University alumni
Writers from Detroit
21st-century African-American people
20th-century African-American people